Llandyfaelog Fach is a hamlet, 35.9 miles (57.8 km) from Cardiff, in the community of Honddu Isaf, Powys, Wales.

Llandyfaelog Fach is represented in the National Assembly by James Evans (Conservative Party), and the Member of Parliament is Fay Jones (Conservative Party).

Landmarks include:
St Maelog Church
The Cross of Briamail

References

Villages in Powys